Elysius hampsoni is a moth of the family Erebidae first described by Paul Dognin in 1907. It is found in Peru.

References

Moths described in 1907
hampsoni
Moths of South America